The Weakest Link 智者生存 (Weakest Link zhizhe shengcun) was the Taiwanese edition of the UK show The Weakest Link, presented by Taiwanese actress and reality host Belle Yu, who was followed by Taiwanese author Tseng Yang Qing. The Chinese title of the show is a word play of Chinese idiom 智者生存, which means "Wise man survival".

Game play 
The first round lasting 3:00 and each following round lasting 10 seconds less than the preceding round, until Round 7, which lasts for 2 minutes, for triple the stakes or a possible NT$120,000. The final round is a 5-question shootout in which the player who answers more questions correctly wins all the money, with  "sudden death" play in the event of a tie.

Special episode 
The show aired one celebrity special in January 2002, the celebrity contestants were playing for charity. The charity went to the Children's Burn Fund of the Republic of China, so the children will have a happy Christmas. In the eighth position, former host Belle Yu also made an appearance in the celebrity special, who originally hosted the show before Tseng Yang Qing.

Money tree

References 

The Weakest Link